The Vijay Award for Best Actor is given by STAR Vijay as part of its annual Vijay Awards ceremony for Tamil  (Kollywood) films. It was given from the second ceremony onwards. Dhanush  and Vikram are the most award winners with 2 awards each.

Winners and nominees

2007:Sathyaraj - Onbadhu Roobai Nottu
Dhanush - Polladhavan
Jiiva - Katrathu Tamil
Vijay - Pokkiri
Sathyaraj - Periyar
2008: Suriya - Vaaranam Aayiram
Dhanush - Yaaradi Nee Mohini
Jayam Ravi - Santosh Subramaniam 
Kamal Haasan - Dasavathaaram
2009: Prakash Raj - Kanchivaram
Arya - Naan Kadavul
Jayam Ravi - Peranmai
Kamal Haasan - Unnaipol Oruvan
Vijay - Villu
2010: Vikram - Raavanan
Arya - Madrasapattinam
Karthi - Naan Mahaan Alla
Silambarasan - Vinnaithaandi Varuvaayaa
Suriya - Raththa Sarithiram
2011: Vikram - Deiva Thirumagal
Vijay - Velayudham
Jiiva - Ko
Suriya - 7aum Arivu
Vishal - Avan Ivan
2012: Dhanush - 3
Suriya - Maattraan
Vijay  - Thuppakki
Vijay Sethupathi - Naduvula Konjam Pakkatha Kaanom
2013: Kamal Haasan - Vishwaroopam
Vishal - Pandiya Naadu
Atharvaa - Paradesi
Vijay - Thalaiva
Vijay Sethupathi - Soodhu Kavvum
2014: Dhanush - Velaiyilla Pattathari
Vijay - Kaththi
Siddharth - Kaaviya Thalaivan
Karthi - Madras
Dinesh - Cuckoo
2017: Vijay Sethupathi - Vikram Vedha
Vijay - Mersal
Karthi - Theeran Adhigaaram Ondru
Vijay - Bairavaa
Vishal - Thupparivaalan

See also
 Tamil cinema
 Cinema of India

References

Actor